Rainey Blackwell Cawthon (October 30, 1907 – April 11, 1991) was an American football player and coach for the Florida Gators of the University of Florida. Cawthon was a member of Florida's "Phantom Four" backfield with Clyde Crabtree, Carl Brumbaugh, and Royce Goodbread in 1928 which led the nation with 336 points scored.  He was also captain of the 1929 Florida team, and selected second-team  for the composite All-Southern that year.  He was inducted into the University of Florida Athletic Hall of Fame as a "Gator Great."  Cawthon was also active in the affairs of Florida State University, and was elected to the FSU Hall of Fame in 1987.

Early years
He attended Leon High School. Later college teammates Ben Clemons and Ed Sauls were high school teammates.

University of Florida

Cawthon was a prominent running back for Tom Sebring and Charlie Bachman's Florida Gators varsity football teams from 1927 to 1929. In Cawthon's sophomore year and first on the varsity, he suffered a broken wrist. Despite this he saw regular service in the backfield by the second game, and completed a 53-yard pass against Mercer. In 1928, Cawthon scored a safety against North Carolina State, a touchdown against Sewanee, and a touchdown against Clemson. He also had a 40-yard run in the 26–6 win over Georgia in Savannah, the first-ever victory over the Bulldogs in school history.

See also
 List of University of Florida Athletic Hall of Fame members

References

1907 births
1991 deaths
Players of American football from Tallahassee, Florida
American football halfbacks
American football fullbacks
Florida Gators football players
Florida State University people
All-Southern college football players